Howarth is a surname of Old English origin, most commonly found among families originating in the English counties of Yorkshire and Lancashire, especially around the village of Great Howarth near Rochdale, Lancashire, and Haworth in Yorkshire. It is found in a variety of different interrelated spellings, including Haworth and Howorth, and derives from one of two meanings, hoh-worth, meaning settlement on a small hill, and haga-worth, settlement surrounded by a hawthorn hedge. The first recorded use of the surname in its current spelling is from 1616; earlier varieties are found as far back as Robert de Hawrth in 1200. Other historical spellings of the name include Hearwarthe and Huarth.

Howarth of Great Howarth

The Howarths of Great Howarth were a landed family originally granted land in what became Great Howarth in Honorsfield, three miles north east of Rochdale in the 12th century. The Norroy Kings of Arms recorded their genealogies on their visitations of Lancashire in 1613 and 1664. The original Elizabethan Howarth Hall in Great Howarth  was demolished in the early 19th century. The family of Howarth of Great Howarth were an important family in the Rochdale area from the 12th to the 18th century. Their estates were however dispersed in 1768 on the death of the last representative of the main line the Rev. Dr Radclyffe Howarth, D.C.L.

A pedigree of the family was set out in summary after the Visitation of Lancashire by Richard St. George, Norroy King of Arms, in 1613 and later in much more detail by Sir William Dugdale, Norroy King of Arms, in 1664/65, following his Lancashire Visitation of 1664. Dugdale detailed the Howarth family's descent from Osbert Howard de Haworth, a Keeper of the King's Buckhounds, in the 12th century until 1665, when Dugdale's friend, Dr Theophilus Howarth, was head of the Howarth family.

The Howard / Howarth of Great Howarth connection

Sir William Dugdale stated that Sir William Howard of Wiggenhall, progenitor of the powerful Howard family, was descended from Robert, a younger brother of Michael Howarth of Great Howarth. Sir William Howard, who lived in Norfolk during the 13th and early 14th centuries, became a judge and founded the line that later became Barons and Earls (several titles) and Dukes of Norfolk. The early references in the 13th century Charters to Peter Howarth as “Peter the clerk of Haword” may lend credence to this theory.

Howarth of Great Howarth Coat of Arms 

Arms: Azure, a bend between two stags’ heads, couped, 
Crest on an Earl's helmet, a wreath Or and Azure, a Stag's head couped and horned Or. The Mantles dependent being gules, doubled, or lined Argent. 
Motto: Quod Ero Spero (What I hope to accomplish I shall accomplish)

People with the surname Howarth

In politics
 Alan Howarth, Baron Howarth of Newport (born 1944), English politician
 David Howarth (born 1958), English academic and politician
 George Howarth (born 1949), English politician
 Gerald Howarth (born 1947), English politician
 Harry Howarth (1916–1969), English politician
 Robert Howarth (1927–2021), English politician
 Valerie Howarth, Baroness Howarth of Breckland (born 1940), English politician
 Luke Howarth (born 1972), Australian Federal Politician

In sport
 Chris Howarth (born 1986), English association footballer
 Geoff Howarth (born 1951), New Zealand cricketer
 Hedley Howarth (1943–2008), New Zealand cricketer
 Jack Howarth (footballer), (born 1945), English association footballer
 Jerry Howarth (born 1946), American-Canadian sports broadcaster
 John Howarth (born 1945), English cricketer
 Russell Howarth (born 1982), English association footballer
 Shane Howarth (born 1968), New Zealand-Welsh rugby union player 
 Stuart Howarth (born 1990), English rugby league player
 Thomas Howarth (born 1845), English cricketer

In music
 Elgar Howarth (born 1935), English composer and conductor
 Peter Howarth (born 1960), English musician
 Tod Howarth (born 1957), American musician

Other
 Brian Howarth, computer game programmer
 David Howarth (author) (1912–1991), British naval historian and author
 F. M. Howarth (1864–1908), American cartoonist
 Frank Howarth (born 1951), Australian public servant
 Jack Howarth (actor), (1896–1984), English television actor
 Glenn Howarth, (1946-2009), Canadian visual artist
 Matt Howarth, American comic book author
 Robert Guy Howarth (1906-1974), Australian scholar, literary critic and poet
 Roger Howarth  (born 1968), American television actor
 Stephen Howarth (born 1981), English artist and poet
 William Howarth (born 1940), American
 Dylan Howarth (born 2001), British
 James Howarth (born 2007), Canadian author
 Penny Howarth (born 1975), British Ceramic Artist
 Virgil Howarth (born 1975), Canadian Actor and producer
 Alexander Howarth (born 1992), Canadian
 Jaclyn Elizabeth Howarth-Valenti (born 1979), American Post Secondary Educator
 Cassie Howarth (born 1986), Australian American actress
 Margaret (Howarth) Johnson (born 1959) Australian Forensic Psychologist
 Keri Louise Howarth (born 1990) Solicitor, United Kingdom

See also
Haworth
Howorth

References

 

English-language surnames
English toponymic surnames